The Capsule is a 2012 Greek short drama film directed by Athina Rachel Tsangari and starring Ariane Labed, Isolda Dychauk, Clémence Poésy, and Aurora Marion. Aleksandra Waliszewska is co-writer of the film. The spoken language is French. The film was shot in Hydra. The film was nominated for the Short Film Grand Jury Prize at the Sundance Film Festival.

Plot 
Seven girls, a mansion perched on a Cycladic rock, a cycle of lessons on discipline, desire and demise-infinitely.

External links 
 

Greek short films
2012 films
Greek drama films
2012 drama films
Films directed by Athina Rachel Tsangari
2012 short films